There are 88 cities in Los Angeles County, California. Each city has a mayor and a city council.

Cities

See also
List of cities and towns in the San Francisco Bay Area
List of municipalities in California

References

 

Los Angeles County
Geography of Los Angeles County, California